Alain Mamou-Mani (born 26 December 1949, Nabeul, Tunisia) is a French film producer and writer.

Biography 
He has written several books (essays, novels) including Life in green on the marriage of ecology and economy" and "Beyond profit" on SRI investments, prefaced by Raoul Vaneigem. Alain Mamou Mani is quoted, meanwhile, in the book of The Ten Commandments by Albert Cohen and Pascal Obispo, with Monsignor Thomas, Dalil Boubakeur and Joseph Sitruk, in 2000.

In 2012, Mamou-Mani was named an Officer of the National Order of Merit (France).

Married to Chantal Pottier, the Éditions Albin Michel publishing press officer, he is the father of the humorist Mamouz, the co-founder of Dynamic Beta Investments, Mathias Mamou-Mani, the architect Arthur Mamou-Mani, and the brother of Guy Mamou-Mani.

Filmography
 2003 : Kedma directed by Amos Gitai
 2003 : Rire et Chatiment directed by Isabelle Doval
 2003 : Alila directed by Amos Gitai
 2004 :  Promised Land directed by Amos Gitai
 2005 : Espace Détente directed by Yvan Le Bolloc'h and Bruno Solo
 2005 : Bunker Paradise directed by Stefan Liberski
 2008 : Un château en Espagne directed by Isabelle Doval

Bibliography
 Au-delà du profit. Comment réconcilier Woodstock et Wall Street, Albin Michel ;
 La vie en vert. Le mariage de l'écologie et de l'économie, éd. Payot ;
 Les Dix Commandements, éd. Albin Michel ;
 Forces majeures (roman), éd. Nil ;
 Du rififi dans les starts-up (roman), éd. Publibook ;
 La Grippe (roman), éd. Inlibroveritas ;
 Le Grand Livre de la tendresse, Albin Michel, 2002 ;
 Le rebond économique de la France – 85 innovateurs, acteurs de la croissance et de l'emploi témoignent, de Vincent Lorphelin collectif, Pearson, 2012.
 La Grippe (roman), éd. Createspace/amazon, 2013 ;
 Vénus, la déesse de l'Amour (roman), éd. Createspace/Amazon avec Ornella Bardini, 2013;
 Au ciel! Rien ne va plus! (pièce de théâtre), éd. Createspace/Amazon, 2013;
 Du rififi dans les starts-up (roman), éd. Publibook, 2014;
 Souvenirs d'en face (récit), éd. Createspace/Amazon, 2014 
 Kill Jean Comment ils ont tue Jean Seberg (roman), éd. Balzac avec Antoine Lassaigne, 2019

Scenarios 
 1980 : Panne des sens (avec Louis Daquin, Caroline Champetier,  Alain Mamou-Mani, Jean-Jacques Kupiec) co-réalisé avec Dominique Chapuis
 1996 : Le jour de la Terre ;
 2018 : The diamond song avec Antoine Lassaigne ;
 2020 : Pour l’amour du faux avec Antoine Lassaigne et Rémy Prechac ;
 2019 :  Le premier pas avec Antoine Lassaigne ; 
 2020 :  Itinéraire d’une groupie avec Antoine Lassaigne;

References

External links 
 
 Unifrance

1949 births
Living people
People from Nabeul
Officers of the Ordre national du Mérite
French film producers
Tunisian emigrants to France
French male writers